Larry E. Joplin (born August 9, 1946) is an American judge currently serving on the Oklahoma Court of Civil Appeals. He was appointed to District 4, Office 2 by Governor David Walters in November 1994.

Early life and education
After graduating from high school in Oklahoma City, Joplin enrolled in the University of Oklahoma, where he earned a B.A. degree. While in law school, he was selected as a participant in both Moot Court and the Oklahoma Law Review.

Career in law
Joplin began his law career joining the firm of Pierce & Barth as an attorney from 1971 to 1973. He filled the same position at Bohannon & Barth from 1973 to 1976. He was appointed as special counsel for the Oklahoma County District Attorney's office from 1976 to 1978. He joined his own private partnership, Wheatley & Joplin, from 1978 to 1982. In 1982, he became a partner with Crowe & Dunlevy until 1993. He began working briefly for the State of Oklahoma in 1993 as director of its Washington D. C. office. He was appointed general counsel for the Oklahoma Department of Insurance from 1993 to November 1994, when Governor Walters appointed him to the Court of Civil Appeals.

Since his initial appointment, Joplin has been retained by voters in the 1996, 1998, 2004, 2010, and 2016 elections. In the 2016 election, 60.68 percent of the voters favored retaining Joplin. His current term expires January 8, 2023.

Personal
Larry Joplin is married to Susan Colley. Susan is known professionally as Rev. Canon Susan Joplin, Priest in Charge of the St. Paul's Episcopal Church in Oklahoma City. They have three children.

Notes

References

See also 
 Oklahoma Court of Civil Appeals

1946 births
Living people
People from Oklahoma City
Oklahoma state court judges
University of Oklahoma alumni